The  was opened in 1983 in Sakata, Yamagata (Japan), the birthplace of the photographer Ken Domon.

On the occasion of becoming the first honorary citizen of Sakata in 1974, Domon donated his entire collection of works to the town. This prompted the decision to build a museum in his honour, and it was the first museum dedicated to photography in Japan.

The museum has about 70,000 prints of works by Domon. It also has works by winners of the Domon Ken Award and another prize, the ) which is presented by the city in Domon's honour.

The museum building was designed by noted architect Yoshio Taniguchi, and won the 9th Isoya Yoshida Award in 1984.

See also
 List of museums devoted to one photographer

References
Matsumoto Norihiko, ed. Nihon no bijutsukan to shashin korekushon (Japan's art galleries and photography collections). Kyoto: Tankōsha, 2002. . Pp. 22–25.

External links

  
 The Hidden Japan

Museums in Yamagata Prefecture
Photography museums and galleries in Japan
Biographical museums in Japan
Photography in Japan
Art museums established in 1983
1983 establishments in Japan
Sakata, Yamagata